IP in IP is an IP tunneling protocol that encapsulates one IP packet in another IP packet. To encapsulate an IP packet in another IP packet, an outer header is added with Source IP, the entry point of the tunnel, and Destination IP, the exit point of the tunnel. While doing this, the inner packet is unmodified (except the TTL field, which is decremented). The Don't Fragment and the Type Of Service fields should be copied to the outer packet. If the packet size, including the outer header, is greater than the Path MTU, the encapsulator fragments the packet. The decapsulator will reassemble the packet.

IP packet encapsulated in IP packet 

Outer IP header has the following fields:

Version: 4 bitsThis field is the Protocol version number. It is always 4 as IP in IP is supported for IPv4

Header Length: 4 bits
This field is the length of outer IP header

Type of Service (TOS): 8 bits
This field is copied from the inner IP header

Total Length: 16 bits
This field is the length of the encapsulated IP packet (including Outer IP Header, Inner IP Header, IP Payload)

Identification: 16 bits
This field is used to identify the fragments of a datagram which will be helpful while reassembling the datagram as the encapsulator might fragment the datagram. For the Outer IP Header, a new number is generated.

Flags: 3 bits

 
R: 1 bit
This bit is reserved and should be 0.
DF: 1 bit
This field specifies whether the datagram can be fragmented or not. If this bit is set to 1 in the inner header, then the outer header also have this bit set to 1 saying that this datagram cannot be fragmented. If this bit is set to 0 in the inner header, then the outer header may set to 0/1.
MF: 1 bit
This field is required when the datagram is fragmented saying whether the datagram contains some more fragments. This field is not copied from inner header. 

Fragment Offset: 13 bits
This field is used while reassembling the fragments.

Time to live (TTL): 8 bits
This field is used to track the lifetime of the datagram. The inner header TTL is decremented before encapsulation and is not changed in decapsulator. The outer header TTL is set to value such that the datagram is delivered to tunnel end point.

Protocol: 8 bits
This field indicates the protocol of the datagram following this header. The value is set to 4 for IP in IP.

Header Checksum: 16 bits
This field is the IP checksum of outer header.

Source IP Address: 32 bits
This field is the IP address of the encapsulator

Destination IP Address: 32 bits
This field is the IP address of the decapsulator

Options: Variable length
This field in general is NOT copied from the inner IP header. New options can be added.

Padding. Variable length.
This field is used to fill the datagram so that IP Payload starts on a 32 bit boundary.

See also
 Internet Control Message Protocol (ICMP)
 Generic Routing Encapsulation (GRE)
 6in4
 4in6

References
 RFC 1853 - IP in IP Tunneling
 RFC 2003 - IP Encapsulation within IP

Internet Protocol
Tunneling protocols